Tima is both a given name and a surname. Notable people with the name include the following

Given name

Female given name
Tima Džebo (born 1963), Yugoslavian basketball player
Tima Shomali (born 1985), Jordanian producer, director, writer, and comedy actress
Tima Turieva (born 1992), Russian weightlifter

Male given name
Tima Fainga'anuku (born 1997), New Zealand rugby union player

Surname
Ana José Tima (born 1989), Dominican triple jumper
Ferenc Tima (1919 – 1976), Hungarian sprinter
Raffy Tima (born 1975), Filipino journalist
Tima Kumkum, Ghanaian TV and radio presenter

See also

TEMA (disambiguation)

Lists of people by surname